Han Peng Dong  (born ) is a Canadian politician who is the member of parliament (MP) for Don Valley North. A member of the Liberal Party, Dong was elected to the House of Commons in 2019 and previously served as the member of provincial parliament (MPP) for Trinity—Spadina from 2014 to 2018, with the Ontario Liberal Party.

Background
Han Peng Dong was born in Shanghai. He moved to Toronto with his family when he was 13 and they settled in the Parkdale neighbourhood of Toronto. He lives in Toronto with his wife Sophie and their two children.

Dong worked as marketing director of Chianti Foods and then with the non-profit Canada Shanghai Business Association. Since making the switch to politics, he spent nine years at Queen's Park serving as Ontario Liberal cabinet minister Gerry Phillips's MPP liaison, and most recently as a senior adviser of community outreach under then Citizenship and Immigration Minister Michael Coteau.

Political career

Member of Provincial Parliament (2014–2018) 
Dong ran in the 2014 provincial election as the Ontario Liberal candidate in the riding of Trinity—Spadina. He defeated New Democrat incumbent Rosario Marchese by 9,175 votes.

He was Parliamentary Assistant to the Minister of Training, Colleges and Universities; Parliamentary Assistant to the Minister of Energy; Parliamentary Assistant to the Minister of Advanced Education and Skills Development; Parliamentary Assistant to the Minister Responsible for the Poverty Reduction Strategy; Vice-chair of the Standing Committee on Finance and Economic Affairs; member of the Select Committee on Sexual Violence and Harassment; member of the Standing Committee on Public Accounts; member of the Standing Committee on Estimates. He also served as the Chair of The Cabinet Committee of Legislations and Regulations.

In February 2016, he introduced a private member's bill to license and regulate the Ontario home inspection industry, which prompted the Ontario Liberal government to draft its own government legislation for that purpose.

In March 2017 Dong introduced another private member's bill, the Reliable Elevators Act, setting time limits on repairs of elevators in residential buildings. The bill was successfully passed. Dong noted the hardship out of service elevators posed to the elderly, and to parents whose children required strollers.

In the 2018 provincial election, Dong was defeated by New Democratic candidate Chris Glover in the redistributed riding of Spadina—Fort York.

Municipal
Dong registered as a candidate in the 2018 Toronto municipal election, to represent Ward 20 on Toronto City Council. After the number of wards in the city was reduced from 47 to 25, Dong did not refile his candidacy by the September 21, 2018, deadline and was thus deemed to have withdrawn.

Member of Parliament (2019–present) 
On July 4, 2019, Dong confirmed his candidacy for the federal Liberal nomination in Don Valley North following the retirement of incumbent MP Geng Tan. Dong was elected to Parliament in the October 2019 federal election.

Dong was re-elected as the MP for Don Valley North in the September 2021 election.

Dong currently serves as the co-chair Canada-China Legislative Association. Dong is also a member of the Standing Committee on Human Resources, Skills, and Social Development and the Status of Persons with Disabilities, and a member of the Standing Committee on Access to Information, Privacy, and Ethics.

Alleged Chinese government interference 

On February 24, 2023, Global News reported that its intelligence sources with knowledge of Canadian Security Intelligence Service (CSIS) affairs reported that Dong was an alleged "witting affiliate" in China's election interference networks. Sources claim that Prime Minister Justin Trudeau and senior Liberal party officials ignored CSIS warnings about Dong, which has been denied by Trudeau.

The same article also claimed that a "Liberal insider" and former Ontario MPP Michael Chan had possibly arranged Tan's ouster in Don Valley North in favour of Dong in advance of the 2019 federal election because the Chinese Communist Party (CCP) was unhappy with Tan. Chan, Dong, and the Chinese embassy denied the accusations, with Dong describing the leaks as "seriously inaccurate". Dong and the Liberal Party also said that his 2019 nomination victory had followed all of the party's rules. According to an anonymous intelligence official and intelligence documents viewed by Global News, CSIS had also been investigating Dong due to an alleged meeting between Dong and a senior official from the CCP's United Front Work Department in New York state.

Dong has stated that he would welcome investigations against himself to clear his name but denies the need for a public inquiry. In response to these allegations, Trudeau has also rejected these allegations as "irresponsible" and a result of anti-Asian racism against Dong. He also stressed that Dong is unquestionably loyal to Canada.

Electoral record

Federal

Provincial

References

External links

1977 births
Businesspeople from Shanghai
Businesspeople from Toronto
Chinese emigrants to Canada
Living people
Ontario Liberal Party MPPs
People from Old Toronto
Politicians from Shanghai
Politicians from Toronto
21st-century Canadian politicians
Canadian politicians of Chinese descent
Members of the House of Commons of Canada from Ontario
Liberal Party of Canada MPs